The 2021–22 Everton Football Club season was the club's 143rd season in existence and the club's 68th consecutive season in the top flight of English football. In addition to the domestic league, Everton participated in this season's editions of the FA Cup and the EFL Cup.

Season summary
On 5 December 2021, director of football Marcel Brands left the club with immediate effect. He had been at Everton since May 2018.

Kits

Squad

First team

Out on loan

Transfers

Transfers in

Transfers out

Loans in

Loans out

Pre-season

Florida Cup 
Everton confirmed they would take part in the seventh edition of The Florida Cup in Orlando. Due to Arsenal's and Inter Milan's withdrawal from the pre-season tournament, The Toffees announced they would face Mexican side UNAM on 28 July.

Competitions

Overview

Premier League

League table

Results summary

Results by matchday

Matches 
The league fixtures were revealed on 16 June 2021.

FA Cup 

Everton were drawn away to Hull City in the third round.

EFL Cup 

Everton entered the competition in the second round and were drawn away to Huddersfield Town and Queens Park Rangers in the third round.

Statistics

Appearances and goals

|-
! colspan=14 style=background:#dcdcdc; text-align:center| Goalkeepers

|-
! colspan=14 style=background:#dcdcdc; text-align:center| Defenders

|-
! colspan=14 style=background:#dcdcdc; text-align:center| Midfielders

|-
! colspan=14 style=background:#dcdcdc; text-align:center| Forwards

|-
! colspan=14 style=background:#dcdcdc; text-align:center| Players transferred/loaned out during the season

|-

Goalscorers

{| class="wikitable sortable" style="text-align:center;"
|-
!"width:35px;"|
!"width:35px;"|
!"width:35px;"|
!"width:200px;"|Player
!"width:75px;"|Premier League
!"width:75px;"|FA Cup
!"width:75px;"|EFL Cup
!"width:75px;"|Total
|-
|rowspan=1| 1 || FW || 7 || align=left|  || 10 || 1 || 0 || 11
|-
|rowspan=1| 2 || FW || 14 || align=left|  || 3 || 2 || 2 || 7
|-
|rowspan=1| 3 || FW || 11 || align=left|  || 5 || 1 || 0 || 6
|-
|rowspan=1| 4 || FW || 9 || align=left|  || 5 || 0 || 0 || 5
|-
|rowspan=1| 5 || FW || 24 || align=left|  || 4 || 0 || 0 || 4
|-
|rowspan=4| 6 || DF || 4 || align=left|  || 2 || 1 || 0 || 3
|-
| DF || 5 || align=left| Michael Keane || 3 || 0 || 0 || 3
|-
| FW || 17 || align=left|  || 2 || 0 || 1 || 3
|-
| FW || 33 || align=left|  || 1 || 2 || 0 || 3
|-
|rowspan=1| 10 || MF || 16 || align=left|  || 2 || 0 || 0 || 2
|-
|rowspan=8| 11 || DF || 12 || align=left|  || 0 || 0 || 1 || 1
|-
| DF || 13 || align=left|  || 0 || 1 || 0 || 1
|-
| DF || 19 || align=left|  || 1 || 0 || 0 || 1
|-
| DF || 21 || align=left|  || 0 || 1 || 0 || 1
|-
| DF || 23 || align=left|  || 1 || 0 || 0 || 1
|-
| MF || 26 || align=left| Tom Davies || 1 || 0 || 0 || 1
|-
| MF || 30 || align=left|  || 1 || 0 || 0 || 1
|-
| DF || 32 || align=left|  || 1 || 0 || 0 || 1
|- 
|colspan="4"| Own goals ||1||0||0||1
|- class="sortbottom"
!colspan="4"|Total || 43 || 9 || 4 || 56
|-

Assists

{| class="wikitable sortable" style="text-align:center;"
|-
!"width:35px;"|
!"width:35px;"|
!"width:35px;"|
!"width:200px;"|Player
!"width:75px;"|Premier League
!"width:75px;"|FA Cup
!"width:75px;"|EFL Cup
!"width:75px;"|Total
|-
|rowspan=2 | 1 || FW || 7 || align=left|  || 5 || 0 || 0 || 5
|-
| FW || 11 || align=left|  || 4 || 1 || 0 || 5
|-
|rowspan=2 | 3 || FW || 14 || align=left|  || 2 || 1 || 1 || 4
|-
| MF || 16 || align=left|  || 4 || 0 || 0 || 4
|-
|rowspan=4| 5 || MF || 2 || align=left|  || 1 || 2 || 0 || 3
|-
| MF || 6 || align=left|  || 2 || 1 || 0 || 3
|-
| MF || 17 || align=left|  || 2 || 1 || 0 || 3
|-
| FW || 24 || align=left|  || 2 || 1 || 0 || 3
|-
|rowspan=3 | 9 || DF || 5 || align=left|  || 2 || 0 || 0 || 2
|-
| FW || 9 || align=left|  || 2 || 0 || 0 || 2
|-
| MF || 21 || align=left|  || 1 || 0 || 1 || 2
|-
| rowspan=4 | 12 || DF || 4 || align=left|  || 1 || 0 || 0 || 1
|-
| MF || 25 || align=left|  || 0 || 1 || 0 || 1
|-
| MF || 26 || align=left|  || 0 || 0 || 1 || 1
|-
| FW || 33 || align=left|  || 1 || 0 || 0 || 1
|-
!colspan="4"|Total || 29 || 8 || 3 || 40
|-

Clean sheets

{|class="wikitable sortable" style="text-align: center;"
|-
!Rank
!Name
!Premier League
!FA Cup
!EFL Cup
!Total
!Played Games
|-
|align=center rowspan=1|1
|align=left| Jordan Pickford
|7
|0
|0
|7
|37
|-
|align=center rowspan=1|2
|align=left| Asmir Begović
|1
|1
|0
|2
|7
|-
!colspan=2|Total!!8!!1!!0!!9!!44

Disciplinary record

{|class="wikitable sortable" style="text-align: center;"
|-
!rowspan="2" style="width:50px;"|Rank
!rowspan="2" style="width:50px;"|Position
!rowspan="2" style="width:180px;"|Name
!colspan="2"|Premier League
!colspan="2"|FA Cup
!colspan="2"|EFL Cup
!colspan="2"|Total
|-
!style="width:30px;"|
!style="width:30px;"|
!style="width:30px;"|
!style="width:30px;"|
!style="width:30px;"|
!style="width:30px;"|
!style="width:30px;"|
!style="width:30px;"|
|-
|rowspan=1| 1 || MF ||align=left| Allan

| 6 || 0

| 0 || 0

| 0 || 0

! 6 !! 0
|-
|rowspan=2| 2 || FW ||align=left| Richarlison

| 5 || 0

| 0 || 0

| 0 || 0

! 5 !! 0
|-
| DF ||align=left| Ben Godfrey

| 4 || 0

| 1 || 0

| 0 || 0

! 5 !! 0
|-
|rowspan=3| 4 || DF ||align=left| Lucas Digne

| 4 || 0

| 0 || 0

| 0 || 0

! 4 !! 0
|-
| MF ||align=left| Abdoulaye Doucouré

| 4 || 0

| 0 || 0

| 0 || 0

! 4 !! 0
|-
| MF ||align=left| Andre Gomes

| 2 || 0

| 1 || 0

| 1 || 0

! 4 !! 0
|-
|rowspan=2| 7 || FW ||align=left| Andros Townsend

| 3 || 0

| 0 || 0

| 0 || 0

! 3 !! 0
|-
| FW ||align=left| Demarai Gray

| 3 || 0

| 0 || 0

| 0 || 0

! 3 !! 0
|-
|rowspan=6| 9 || DF ||align=left| Séamus Coleman

| 2 || 0

| 0 || 0

| 0 || 0

! 2 !! 0
|-
| FW ||align=left| Salomón Rondón

| 2 || 0

| 0 || 0

| 0 || 0

! 2 !! 0
|-
| DF ||align=left| Yerry Mina

| 2 || 0

| 0 || 0

| 0 || 0

! 2 !! 0
|-
| FW ||align=left| Dominic Calvert-Lewin

| 2 || 0

| 0 || 0

| 0 || 0

! 2 !! 0
|-
| FW ||align=left| Anthony Gordon

| 1 || 0

| 1 || 0

| 0 || 0

! 2 !! 0
|-
| DF ||align=left| Mason Holgate

| 1 || 1

| 0 || 0

| 0 || 0

! 1 !! 1
|-
|rowspan=12| 15 || GK ||align=left| Jordan Pickford

| 1 || 0

| 0 || 0

| 0 || 0

! 1 !! 0
|-
| MF ||align=left| Fabian Delph

| 1 || 0

| 0 || 0

| 0 || 0

! 1 !! 0
|-
| DF ||align=left| Jonjoe Kenny

| 1 || 0

| 0 || 0

| 0 || 0

! 1 !! 0
|-
| DF ||align=left| Michael Keane

| 1 || 0

| 0 || 0

| 0 || 0

! 1 !! 0
|-
| FW ||align=left| Alex Iwobi

| 1 || 0

| 0 || 0

| 0 || 0

! 1 !! 0
|-
| FW ||align=left| Dele Alli

| 1 || 0

| 0 || 0

| 0 || 0

! 1 !! 0
|-
| MF ||align=left| Donny van de Beek

| 1 || 0

| 0 || 0

| 0 || 0

! 1 !! 0
|-
| DF ||align=left| Vitaliy Mykolenko

| 0 || 0

| 1 || 0

| 0 || 0

! 1 !! 0
|-
| FW ||align=left| Moise Kean

| 0 || 0

| 0 || 0

| 0 || 1

! 0 !! 1
|-
!colspan=3|Total!!48!!1!!2!!0!!1!!1!!51!!2

See also
 2021–22 in English football
 List of Everton F.C. seasons

References 

Everton F.C. seasons
Everton